Femme nue dormant au bord de l'eau (Naked Woman sleeping by the Water) is a 1921 oil on canvas painting by the Swiss and French artist Félix Vallotton. It was given to the Strasbourg museum by Vallotton's widow in 1926 and is now in the Musée d'Art moderne et contemporain. Its inventory number is 55.974.0.879.

The woman's body, with its greenish shadows and uncomfortable posture, is deliberately depicted in an anti-naturalistic manner. The three rowing men on the right edge of the painting are supposed to be the products of the woman's dream. In any case, their movement and activity contrast with the sleeper's indolence and inertia.

References

External links 
Femme nue dormant au bord de l'eau, presentation of the painting on the museum's website

Paintings in the collection of the Strasbourg Museum of Modern and Contemporary Art
1921 paintings
Nude art
Sleep
Oil on canvas paintings